José Manuel 'Manolo' Díaz Fernández (born 30 August 1968) is a Spanish professional football manager and former player who played as a forward.

Coaching career
Born in Madrid, Díaz began his managerial career at the Juvenil squad of Real Madrid, leaving the club in 2006 after the arrival of the new president Ramón Calderón. After a brief period in Mexico he returned to Spain, and was appointed at CDA Navalcarnero in summer 2008.

Díaz was named coach of Real Madrid C a year later, following Florentino Pérez's return as president. In 2011–12 he led the team to the second place in the regular season, and despite losing in the playoffs, saw them achieve promotion to Segunda División B due to administrative relegations.

On 19 November 2013, Díaz replaced the fired Alberto Toril at the helm of the B side. His first match in charge was four days later, a 0–0 home draw against CD Numancia. Late into the year, he finally took the reserves out of the last position in Segunda División, after winning 13 out of a possible 15 points and four consecutive wins.

In July 2014, Díaz was appointed at SD Ponferradina in the second division. On 31 January 2016, after the sixth loss in seven matches, he was dismissed; the campaign eventually ended in relegation.

Díaz returned to the Santiago Bernabéu Stadium on 24 June 2017, being appointed youth system coordinator. In late October 2018, as Santiago Solari was named Julen Lopetegui's successor in the first team, he replaced the former at Castilla.

On 8 September 2021, following a brief spell in the Spanish third tier with Hércules CF, Díaz was announced as the head coach of Indian Super League side SC East Bengal. He resigned at the end of the year, following a poor start to the season.

Managerial statistics

References

External links

1968 births
Living people
Footballers from Madrid
Spanish footballers
Association football forwards
Segunda División B players
Tercera División players
RSD Alcalá players
Getafe CF footballers
Spanish football managers
Segunda División managers
Segunda División B managers
Tercera División managers
Real Madrid C managers
Real Madrid Castilla managers
SD Ponferradina managers
Hércules CF managers
Indian Super League head coaches
East Bengal Club managers
Spanish expatriate football managers
Expatriate football managers in India
Spanish expatriate sportspeople in India